was a junior college in Ginowan, Okinawa, Japan, .

The institute was founded in 1972，closed in 1999.

Educational institutions established in 1972
Japanese junior colleges
Private universities and colleges in Japan
Universities and colleges in Okinawa Prefecture